Egesina fusca is a species of beetle in the family Cerambycidae. It was described by Warren Samuel Fisher in 1925.

Subspecies
 Egesina fusca fusca (Fisher, 1925)
 Egesina fusca javicola Breuning, 1963

References

Egesina
Beetles described in 1925